Oxalis inaequalis is a bulb-forming species of flowering plant in the wood sorrel family. It is native to South Africa's Cape Provinces. Each plant produces a rosette of up to 70 succulent leaves, which occasionally produce aerial bulbs. The flowers are yellow and copper-coloured. The sepals are of unequal sizes, hence the specific epithet "inaequalis", which is Latin for "unequal".

See also 
 List of Latin and Greek words commonly used in systematic names

References 

inaequalis
Flora of South Africa